This is a complete list of golfers who have played against the United States in the Ryder Cup for the following teams:
  Great Britain: 1927 to 1971
  Great Britain and  Ireland: 1973 to 1977
  Europe: 1979 to 2021
159 golfers have been in the final teams. In addition the list below includes Miguel Ángel Martín who qualified for the European 1997 Ryder Cup team but withdrew due to injury. Seven of the golfers in the final teams were never chosen to play in any matches so that only 152 of these golfers have actually played in the Ryder Cup.

In 1973 the official title of the British Team had been changed from "Great Britain" to "Great Britain and Ireland", but this was simply a change of name to reflect the fact that golfers from the Republic of Ireland had been playing in the Great Britain Ryder Cup team since 1953, while Northern Irish players had competed since 1947. In addition, two golfers from Jersey (a British Crown Dependency and one of the Channel Islands) played on the Great Britain team in the 1920s.

Players

Playing record 
Source:

W = Matches won, L = Matches lost, H = Matches halved

In this table the appearances includes players who were in the final team but were not selected for any matches. It does not include those who were initially selected or who qualified but were later replaced. Thus Mitchell (1927), Jolly (1931), Olazábal (1995) and Martín (1997) are excluded.

Record European point winners

European country records 

This table excludes José María Olazábal (in 1995) and Miguel Ángel Martín (in 1997) who withdrew due to injury and were replaced in the team. Martín never played in a Ryder Cup team. Nick Faldo played in 11 Ryder Cups but made his debut in 1977 for Great Britain and Ireland.

In the 21 contests from 1979 to 2021 there have been 158 appearances by players from Great Britain and Ireland (an average of 7.52) and 94 by those from Continental Europe (an average of 4.48).

Family relationships
The following European Ryder Cup players are or have been related:

 Peter Alliss was the son of Percy Alliss.
 Ignacio Garrido is the son of Antonio Garrido.
 Ernest Whitcombe, Charles Whitcombe and Reg Whitcombe were brothers. All three played together in the 1935 Ryder Cup.
 Bernard Hunt and Geoffrey Hunt were brothers. They played together in the 1963 Ryder Cup.
 Edoardo Molinari and Francesco Molinari are brothers. They played together in the 2010 Ryder Cup.
 Christy O'Connor Snr was the uncle of Christy O'Connor Jnr.
 Bernard Gallacher is the uncle of Stephen Gallacher.
 Brian Barnes was the son-in-law of Max Faulkner. Barnes was married to Faulkner's daughter Hilary.
 Lee Westwood was the brother-in-law of Andrew Coltart. Westwood was married to Coltart's sister Laurae. They played together in the 1999 Ryder Cup.
 Per-Ulrik Johansson is the brother-in-law of Jesper Parnevik. Johansson is married to Parnevik's sister Jill. They played together in the 1997 Ryder Cup, although Per-Ulrik Johansson did not marry Jill Parnevik until 2002.

See also
 List of American Ryder Cup golfers
 Lists of golfers

References

External links
PGA Media Guide 2012
About.com golf Ryder Cup Records

Ryder Cup, Europe
 
Ryder Cup lists